Two different automobiles from Rover have been called the 2000:
 Rover P6, 1963-1977 
 Rover SD1, 1976-1986

2000